The 1969–70 season was Stoke City's 63rd season in the Football League and the 39th in the First Division.

Stoke seemingly had an abundance of talent emerging as the 1960s gave way for the 1970s and Waddington addressed the past two seasons lack of goals by bringing back John Ritchie from Sheffield Wednesday and Jimmy Greenhoff from Birmingham City. It was a promising season with Stoke finishing in 9th position with 45 points.

Season review

League
After two poor seasons, Tony Waddington recognised the goalscoring shortcomings and won over some of the worried supporters by bringing in former Leeds United forward Jimmy Greenhoff for a club record £100,000 and also brought back John Ritchie from Sheffield Wednesday. There was certainly a feeling around Stoke, with the infusion of forward talent that the club was putting together a side that could cause a few raised eyebrows in the First Division and whilst Alex Elder and Tony Allen were early season selections in defence they were soon drifting from the spotlight allowing local defenders Jackie Marsh and Mike Pejic to break into the team.

With Gordon Banks in goals and the ever improving centre back pairing of 'hard men' Alan Bloor and Denis Smith, Stoke's back line looked solid. In midfield Irish winger Terry Conroy had now settled in England and was beginning to show his skill and pace on the wide positions. The improvements were there for all to see and the directors were keen to bring the best to the Victoria Ground and in September 1969 they achieved their aim. Brazilian star Pelé came over with his team Santos to play Stoke in a friendly, Pelé starring in a 3–2 win for the South Americans.

Early on in the 1969–70 season after winning six and drawing five for their first 15 matches, Stoke suffered a 6–2 reverse at Everton when John Farmer, making his only appearance of the season, was carried off due to injury and defender Denis Smith had to go in goal. They quickly put that defeat behind them and lost only once of the next ten matches. But an absence of victories between 17 January and 28 March saw the team slip down into mid-table and finished up in 9th spot, their highest league finish for 22 years.

FA Cup
Stoke advanced past Oxford United 3–2 in a replay following a goalless draw at the Manor Ground before being knocked at Watford.

League Cup
There was no progress in this seasons league cup, as Stoke lost 2–0 at home to Burnley.

Final league table

Results

Stoke's score comes first

Legend

Football League First Division

FA Cup

League Cup

Friendlies

Squad statistics

References

Stoke City F.C. seasons
Stoke